Gaberella is a genus of leaf beetles in the subfamily Eumolpinae, found in Africa. It contains only one species, Gaberella costata, found in Sudan, Uganda, the Republic of the Congo, the Democratic Republic of the Congo, Cameroon, Bioko and Ivory Coast. This species was first described by Joseph Sugar Baly in 1878, and was originally placed in Menius.

References 

Eumolpinae
Beetles of Africa
Beetles of the Democratic Republic of the Congo
Insects of Cameroon
Insects of the Republic of the Congo
Insects of Uganda
Insects of Sudan
Monotypic Chrysomelidae genera
Insects of West Africa
Insects of Equatorial Guinea
Fauna of Bioko